Seyssel Canton may refer to:
 Seyssel, Ain
 Seyssel, Haute-Savoie

Canton name disambiguation pages